The Piper J-4 Cub Coupe is a two place side-by-side version of the Piper J-3 that was built between 1938 and 1942 by Piper Aircraft. It was Piper's first model with side-by-side seating; combined with docile low-speed handling, this made it a good trainer.

J-4 development

The fuselage of the J-4 was wider than the J-3 and the aircraft had a fully enclosed rear decking to the fuselage top. The first J-4s had a Continental 50 hp A50 engine with upward-facing exhaust ports, an open cowl, oil and spring landing gear, a modified tail wheel system and many other changes. The early J-4 had a comfortable cockpit but was slower than most side by side aircraft of the day. 
 	
The 1940 J-4A gained a fully enclosed cowling, a Continental 65 hp A65 engine, and aft auxiliary fuel. The J-4B was fitted with a 60 hp Franklin 4AC-171 engine. The final version was the 1941 J-4E which sported a 75 hp Continental engine and redesigned interior. The main fuel tank was moved to the wing along with a header tank. Performance was now on par with similar contemporary types, but the attack on Pearl Harbor sealed its fate as all civilian aircraft manufacture came to a stop with the entry of the United States into World War II.

Some J-4s had another unique feature in the tail construction:  the stabilizer was made of stainless steel tubing, riveted together with gussets.

Variants
J-4 powered by a 50-hp (37-kW) Continental A50-1 piston engine.
J-4A powered by a 65-hp (48-kW) Continental A65-1 or -8 piston engine.
J-4B powered by a 60-hp (45-kW) Franklin 4AC-171 or 65-hp (48-kW) 4AC-176-B2 piston engine.
J-4E powered by a 75-hp (56-kW) Continental A75-9 piston engine.
J-4F powered by a 55-hp (41-kW) Avco Lycoming O-145-A1, -A2 or 65-hp (48-kW) O-145-B1 piston engine.

Specification (J-4A)

See also

References
Notes

Bibliography

External links

J-4
1930s United States sport aircraft
Single-engined tractor aircraft
High-wing aircraft
Aircraft first flown in 1938